Oscar Robert Schumann (August 31, 1885 – December 8, 1972) was an American politician in the state of Washington. He served in the Washington House of Representatives from 1939 to 1953 for District 14.

References

1885 births
1972 deaths
Republican Party members of the Washington House of Representatives